Courtney Duncan (born 26 January 1996) is a New Zealand professional motocross racer. In 2019, she won the first of her three FIM Women's Motocross World Championships, with nine wins from ten races.

Career summary

References

External links
 Profile at mxgp.com
 GP Results at mxgpresults.com

1996 births
Living people
Female motorcycle racers
New Zealand motocross riders
People from Otago
20th-century New Zealand women
21st-century New Zealand women